The Pellejas River is a river of Utuado, Puerto Rico. Pellejas is a tributary to the Río Grande de Arecibo river.

See also
Blanco Bridge: NRHP listing in Utuado, Puerto Rico
List of rivers of Puerto Rico

References

External links
 USGS Hydrologic Unit Map – Caribbean Region (1974)

Rivers of Puerto Rico